"You're Sixteen" is a song written by the Sherman Brothers (Robert B. Sherman and Richard M. Sherman). It was first performed by American rockabilly singer Johnny Burnette, whose version peaked at number eight on the US Billboard Hot 100 in December 1960 and number 3 in the UK in 1961. The song was covered by Ringo Starr in 1973 and this version reached number one in the US.

In popular culture
The version by Burnette was included on the soundtrack to the 1973 film American Graffiti, directed by George Lucas.

Chart history

Weekly charts

Year-end charts

Personnel
The personnel on the Johnny Burnette version included:

 Johnny Burnette – vocal
 Bobby Gibbons – guitar
 Vincent Terri – guitar
 Red Callender – bass
 Ernie Freeman – piano
 Jerry Allison – drums
 Alvin Dinkin – viola
 Stanley Harris – viola
 Dave Berman – violin

 Herman Clebanoff – violin
 Harold Dicterow – violin
 Ben "Benny" Gill – violin
 Irma Newman – violin
 Joe Stepansky – violin
 Darrel Terwilliger – violin
 Gerald Vinci – violin
 Bill Tobin – backing vocals

Ringo Starr version

Ringo Starr's version was released as a single in the United States on December 3, 1973, and in the UK on February 8, 1974.

In January 1974, the song, taken from the album Ringo, hit number one on the Billboard Hot 100. The latter performance reunited Ringo Starr with his former Beatles bandmate Paul McCartney. Although McCartney is credited on the liner notes of the album Ringo as having played the solo on a kazoo, reviewer Michael Verity has quoted the song's producer Richard Perry as revealing that it wasn't actually a kazoo: "In fact, the solo on 'You're Sixteen,' which sounds like a kazoo or something, was Paul singing very spontaneously as we played that track back, so he’s singing the solo on that." Starr's version remains one of the few No. 1 singles to feature a 'kazoo-sound' solo. Harry Nilsson sang backing vocals on Starr's version; Nicky Hopkins is heard playing the piano, including going up and down the scale in the instrumental fade of the song.  In Ringo's version, the melody and the chords were different in the bridge section, which led to a minor key, while the original version used only major keys. The ending featured Starr singing the chorus from Clarence "Frogman" Henry's hit song "(I Don't Know Why) But I Do" before breaking into a chorus of "What Shall We Do With the Drunken Sailor?" at the fade.

Its 1978 music video, an excerpt of Starr's TV movie Ringo, features Carrie Fisher as Starr's love interest.

Reception
Upon release, a reviewer for Cash Box called Ringo's version "fantastic and perfect for the '70's," going on to say that "not only is the vocal perfect, and steady, for this delightful easy going rocker, but the music is the perfect complement."

In 2019, Tom Breihan of Stereogum reviewed the song negatively, writing that, as it relates to musicians courting or having sex with teenagers, "Ringo Starr wasn't the worst offender of his era, and there's plenty of plausible deniability built into 'You're Sixteen.' But it's still a gross song. And even if it wasn't gross, it's not like it has any real musical merit. Maybe people thought this shit was cute then, but it's not cute now, and I won't be sad if I never hear 'You're Sixteen' again."

Chart history

Weekly charts

Year-end charts

References
 Footnotes

 Citations

1960 singles
1973 singles
1974 singles
Johnny Burnette songs
Ringo Starr songs
Songs written by the Sherman Brothers
Apple Records singles
Billboard Hot 100 number-one singles
Cashbox number-one singles
Song recordings produced by Snuff Garrett
Song recordings produced by Richard Perry
London Records singles
Liberty Records singles
1960 songs
Songs about teenagers